Kam-Klyuch is a rural locality (a village) in Teplyakovsky Selsoviet, Burayevsky District, Bashkortostan, Russia. The population was 4 as of 2010. It has 1 street.

Geography 
Kam-Klyuch is located 28 km north of Burayevo (the district's administrative centre) by road. Sarsaz is the nearest rural locality.

References 

Rural localities in Burayevsky District